Choi Yeon-sung, also known as iloveoov, is a retired professional Korean StarCraft player, and formerly a coach for the Afreeca Freecs' League of Legends team. As a Terran player he was known for his excellent macromanagement, leading to his nickname "Cheater Terran". However he is better known as "Monster Terran" (Gweh_Mool Terran) because of his ability to produce a massive number of units. 
The 'oov' in his nickname is believed to be the ASCII emotion icon of a face and two fingers forming letter 'V' which stands for victory.

Career
He sees Lim Yo-Hwan, who was on the same team as him, as an older brother or mentor. Lim scouted Choi through a match in battlenet after losing to Choi's Terran, Zerg and Protoss. Choi beat Lim 3:2 in 2004 during the Ongamenet Ever Starleague finals.

He announced his retirement as a pro-gamer as a result of a wrist injury, to become a coach for his team. Since then, Choi returned to the active roster as a "player coach".

In 2016 SK Telecom T1 disbanded their Starcraft 2 roster and Choi became head coach for the Afreeca Freecs League of Legends team. He led the team to a quarterfinals berth at the 2018 League of Legends World Championship but was ultimately defeated 3-0 by Cloud9 and eliminated.

In subsequent seasons he failed to replicate his success, failing to qualify for the World Championship in 2019 and also failing to make playoffs in the 2020 Spring Split. In November 2020, Choi parted ways with Afreeca Freecs.

Personal life
In April 2008, Choi announced his engagement to his girlfriend. Choi and his fiancée had been together for six years, even when he was training to become a professional gamer.

Tournament results
TriGem MSL Champion – September – November 2003
HanaFOS MSL Champion – January – March 2004
Gillette OnGameNet Starleague 3rd place – April – July 2004
Spris MSL Champion – May – August 2004
Ever OSL Champion – August – November 2004
UZOO MSL 4th place – June – August 2005
So1 OSL 3rd place – August – November 2005
CKCG China-Korea Cyber Games Champion – October 2005
CYON MSL 3rd place – October – January 2006
Shinhan OSL Champion  – December 2005 – March 2006
World Cyber Games 2006 Champion – October 2006
Second player to win 3 MSLs, along with NaDa.
2018 League of Legends World Championship 5-8th Place - October 2018

Streaks
His streaks versus Zerg are particularly notable.

Record: 79 wins – 37 losses (68.10%)

Best Streak: 27 wins    Worst Streak: 4 losses    Current Streak: 1 win

Overall Record
All:  	228–143  	(61.46%)
vT: 	82–62 	(56.94%)
vZ: 	79–37 	(68.10%)
vP: 	67–44 	(60.36%)

See also
StarCraft professional competition

References

External links
 
 gg.net: Player profile & game record and last played games

South Korean esports players
StarCraft players
1983 births
Living people
T1 (esports) players
StarCraft coaches
Choe clan of Jeonju